Born Under a Bad Sign is a 1967 compilation album by Albert King.

Born Under a Bad Sign may also refer to:

 "Born Under a Bad Sign" (song), by Albert King, 1967
 "Born Under a Bad Sign", a season 2 episode of Supernatural

See also
 Born Under a Bad Neon Sign, a 2006 album by the Flaming Stars